Firefall was a Top Spin located at California's Great America. Manufactured by HUSS Park Attractions, the ride was originally located at Geauga Lake under the name Texas Twister. It was the first of its kind in North America. Upon the park's closing in 2007, the ride was relocated to its sister park, California's Great America, where it reopened in 2008. When it was moved, its original ride program was slightly modified.

The ride featured a wall of water fountains which rose in front of the vehicle as it swung, giving the illusion that riders may get wet. Its finale sequence featured the bubbling water via pneumatic devices before catching on fire through the use of methane gas. The ride was set to the same soundtrack composed for the defunct ride The Crypt at Kings Dominion.

References

External links

 The Crypt at King's Dominion

California's Great America
Amusement rides manufactured by HUSS Park Attractions
Amusement rides introduced in 2008
Cedar Fair attractions
Amusement rides that closed in 2007